The Greek Basketball Cup MVP, or Greek Basketball Cup Finals MVP, is an annual award that is given to the most valuable player of the Greek Basketball Cup, which is the top-tier national domestic professional men's basketball cup competition in the country of Greece. The Greek Basketball Cup is contested between teams from the 1st-tier level Greek Basket League, the 2nd-tier level Greek A2 Basket League, and the third-tier level Greek B Basket League.

Greek Basketball Cup Finals game top scorers and MVPs 
Since the first Greek Cup in 1976, the Top Scorer of the Greek Cup Finals is given an award, regardless of whether he plays on the winning or losing team. Since 1995, an MVP is also named at the conclusion of the finals.

Multiple Greek Cup Finals Top Scorers

Multiple Greek Cup Finals MVP winners

See also
Greek Basketball Cup
Greek Basket League

References

External links 
 Official Hellenic Basketball Federation Site 
  
 Official English website 
 Greek Basket League Highlights  
 Greek Basketball (Men) Eurobasket.com 
 Basketblog.gr 

 
Basketball most valuable player awards
European basketball awards